Woldemar of Lippe (Günther Friedrich Woldemar; 18 April 1824 – 20 March 1895) was the sovereign of the Principality of Lippe, reigning from 1875 until his death.

Early life and reign
Prince Woldemar of Lippe was born in Detmold the third child of Leopold II, Lippe's reigning prince, and his consort, Princess Emilie of Schwarzburg-Sondershausen (1800–1867). Woldemar was married to Princess Sophie of Baden (1834–1904), a daughter of Prince William of Baden, on 9 November 1858 in Karlsruhe.

Following the death of his brother Leopold III on 8 December 1875, Woldemar succeeded him as Prince of Lippe. In 1892 along with the other German sovereigns Woldemar attended a gathering in Berlin with the German Emperor William II. After the Emperor described the other sovereigns as his vassals, Prince Waldemar took exception and interrupted the speech to say, "No, Sire, not your vassals. Your allies, if you like". This was seen as the coup de grâce to the Emperor's ambition to become "Emperor of Germany" instead of just "German Emperor".

Death and regency dispute
Following his death in Detmold, Woldemar was succeeded as Prince of Lippe by his brother Alexander. His brother, however, was suffering from a mental illness and, as he had been placed under legal restrictions in 1870, and 1893 it was necessary for a regency to be established in Lippe. Prince Woldemar foreseeing this had made a provision in his will that the regency should go to Prince Adolf of Schaumburg-Lippe, the brother-in-law of the German Emperor.

Prince Woldemar's decision to appoint Prince Adolf was the beginning of a decade long dispute between two lines of the House of Lippe, the Lippe-Biesterfeld's led by Count Ernst who claimed the regency, and the princes of Schaumburg-Lippe. There were various compromises and the matter was finally resolved in 1905.

Ancestry

References

External links

A summary of events can be found at Wikinfo 

1824 births
1895 deaths
People from Detmold
House of Lippe
Princes of Lippe
Generals of Cavalry (Prussia)